Ema is a 2019 Chilean drama film directed by Pablo Larraín from a screenplay by Guillermo Calderón and Alejandro Moreno. It stars Mariana Di Girolamo, Cristian Suarez, Gael García Bernal, Paola Giannini and Santiago Cabrera.

It had its world premiere at the Venice Film Festival on August 30, 2019.

Plot

Ema, a young dancer, divorces Gaston, the director of the company for which she performs. She is unable to overcome her sense of guilt towards Polo, the child they had adopted to make up for Gaston's sterility and whom they have later again brought back to the orphanage. A tragedy follows caused by the child's pyromania.

Cast
Mariana Di Girolamo as Ema
Gael García Bernal as Gastón
Paola Giannini as Raquel
Santiago Cabrera as Aníbal
Giannina Fruttero
Josefina Fiebelkorn
Paula Hofmann
Paula Luchsinger
Antonia Giesen
Catalina Saavedra
Mariana Loyola
Susana Hidalgo
Amparo Noguera
Cristian Felipe Suarez as Polo
Claudio Arredondo
Claudia Cabezas
Paula Zúñiga
Diego Muñoz

Production
In August 2018, it was announced Mariana Di Girolamo, Gael García Bernal, Paola Giannini, Santiago Cabrera, Giannina Fruttero, Josefina Fiebelkorn, Paula Hofmann, Paula Luchsinger, Antonia Giesen, Catalina Saavedra, Mariana Loyola and Susana Hidalgo had joined the cast of the film, with Pablo Larraín directing from a screenplay by Guillermo Calderón and Alejandro Moreno. Juan de Dios Larraín will serve as producer on the film under his Fabula banner.

Filming
Principal photography began in August 2018.

Release
It had its world premiere at the Venice Film Festival on August 31, 2019. It also screened at the Toronto International Film Festival on September 9, 2019. It was released in Chile on 26 September 2019. Shortly after, Mubi and Music Box Films acquired U.K. and U.S. distribution rights to the film. Mubi previously planned a theatrical release for the film, but it was cancelled due to the COVID-19 pandemic. Instead, the film was released through video streaming services in the U.K, Ireland and India, from 2 May 2020.

Ema was released in Australian cinemas on May 13, 2021. It was released in the United States on 13 August 2021.

Critical response

On Rotten Tomatoes, the film has an approval rating of 88% based on 141 reviews, with an average rating of 7.50/10. The consensus reads, "Beautifully filmed and powerfully acted, Ema puts a thoroughly distinctive spin on its story of emotional trauma and self-discovery." On Metacritic, the film has a weighted average score of 71 out of 100, based on reviews from 25 critics, indicating "generally favorable reviews."

References

External links

Ema, official international Trailer

2019 films
Chilean drama films
Films set in Chile
Films shot in Chile
Films directed by Pablo Larraín
2010s Chilean films
2010s Spanish-language films